In music, the all-trichord hexachord is a unique hexachord that contains all twelve trichords, or from which all twelve possible trichords may be derived. The prime form of this set class is {012478} and its Forte number is 6-Z17. Its complement is 6-Z43 and they share the interval vector of <3,2,2,3,3,2>.

It appears in pieces by Robert Morris and Elliott Carter. Carter uses all-interval twelve-tone sets consisting of all-trichord hexachords in his Symphonia: sum fluxae pretium spei.

See also
All-combinatorial hexachord
All-interval tetrachord
All-interval twelve-tone row

References

Further reading

Boland, Marguerite (1999). "The All-trichord Hexachord: Compositional Strategies in Elliott Carter's Con leggerezza pensosa and Gra and a Folio of Original Compositions". MA Thesis, La Trobe University (Alegant 2010, p. 307n4). .
Boland, Marguerite (2006). "'Linking' and 'Morphing': Harmonic Flow in Elliott Carter's Con Leggerezza Pensosa". Tempo 60, no. 237 (July): 33–43. .
Boros, James (1990). "Some Properties of the All-Trichord Hexachord", In Theory Only 11/6: 19–41.
Capuzzo, Guy (2004). "The Complement Union Property in the Music of Elliott Carter". Journal of Music Theory 48, no. 1 (Spring): 1–24. .
Capuzzo, Guy (2007). "Registral Constraints on All-Interval Rows in Elliott Carter's Changes". Intégral 21:79–108. .
Morris, Robert D. (1990). "Pitch-Class Complementation and Its Generalizations". Journal of Music Theory 34, no. 2 (Autumn): 175–245. .
Morris, Robert (1995). "Compositional Spaces and Other Territories". Perspectives of New Music 33, nos. 1 & 2 (Winter–Summer):328–358. .
Ravenscroft, Brenda (2003). "Setting the Pace: The Role of Speeds in Elliott Carter's A Mirror on Which to Dwell". Music Analysis 22, no. 3 (October): 253–282. . .
Roeder, John (2009). "A Transformational Space for Elliott Carter's Recent Complement-union Music". In Mathematics and Computation in Music, edited by Timour Klouche and Thomas Noll, 303–310. Communications in Computer and Information Science 37. New York: Springer. pp. 303–310. ..
Sallmen, Mark (2007). "Listening to the Music Itself: Breaking Through the Shell of Elliott Carter's 'In Genesis'", Music Theory Online 13/3 (Alegant 2010, p. 307n4). (Accessed 31 March 2014)

Chords
Hexachords
Twelve-tone technique
Hemitonic scales
Musical set theory